AH Velorum is a single, yellow-white hued star in the constellation Vela. It has an average apparent visual magnitude of 5.70, which makes it bright enough to be dimly visible to the naked eye in good seeing conditions. It is moving further away from the Earth with a heliocentric radial velocity of +26 km/s.

It is a bright giant/supergiant of spectral type F7 Ib-II. The star is around 50 million years old with a projected rotational velocity of 10 km/s. It has 7 times the mass of the Sun and is radiating 930 times the Sun's luminosity from its photosphere at an effective temperature of 6,102 K.

A classical Cepheid variable, its apparent magnitude ranges from 5.50 to 5.89 over 4.227171 days.  It pulsates in the first overtone, with a fundamental period of 6.04 days.

References

F-type supergiants
F-type bright giants
Classical Cepheid variables
Vela (constellation)
Durchmusterung objects
068808
040155
3232
Velorum, AH